Postage stamps from Albania are marked Shqiperia, Shqiperise and Shqiptare.

Turkish stamps 
Albania used the postage stamps of Turkey from 1870 to 1913.

First stamps 
Albania issued its first stamps in 1913.

World War II 
During World War II, stamps were produced during the Italian, German and Greek occupation.

Gallery of Albanian stamps

See also
 Hasluck Collection
 List of people on stamps of Albania
 Posta Shqiptare
 Postage stamps and postal history of Epirus

References and sources

References

Sources
Encyclopedia of Postal History.

Further reading
 Gjinaj, Kolë. Historia e Filatelise Shqiptare. Shkodër: Botim i Muzeut Historik të Shkodrës, 1996
 Nika, Thimi. Historia e Filatelisë Shqiptare: 100 vjet Pulla Shqiptare (1913-2013). Tiranë: Shtëpia Botuese Mediaprint, 2013  417p.
 Phipps, John, S. The Stamps and Posts of Albania and Epirus 1878 to 1945. Bristol: Stuart Rossiter Trust Fund, 2002  285p.
 Smaili, B. et al. Pulla Poste Shqipetare = Albanian Postage Stamps, 1913-1959. Tirana: Botuar nga Drejtoria e Pergjitheshme P. T. T. te Republikes Popullore te Shquiperise, 1959

Postal system of Albania
Philately of Albania